Todd Lamb (born May 30, 1970) is a professional American race car driver, Engineer, and Entrepreneur. He previously lived in Royal Oak, Michigan and currently resides in Atlanta, Georgia.

Engineering
Todd graduated from GMI Engineering & Management Institute in 1993 with a degree in mechanical engineering. He worked for 10 years in the Detroit area as an automotive engineer, designing safety components for cars and light trucks.

Entrepreneur
In 2002, Todd became founder and publisher of the car magazine, Speed, Style, & Sound.
In 2004, Todd became founder and publisher of the custom sportbike magazine, 2Wheel Tuner.
He sold his publishing company in 2007.

Racing

Early career
Todd began racing go-karts at the age of ten. He graduated from the Skip Barber Racing School in 1996.

2007
Todd won the national championship in Spec Miata with OPM Autosports.
Todd won the 25 Hours of Thunderhill with BiggsB Racing.

2008
Todd won the national championship in Spec Miata with SafeRacer.
Todd won the American Road Race of Champions at Road Atlanta with East Street Auto.
Todd won the 13 Hours at Virginia International Raceway with OPM Autosports.

2009
Competing in the Playboy Mazda MX-5 Cup series, Todd set series records for number of poles (7), wins (8), and consecutive poles (5) on the way to winning the championship with Atlanta Motorsports Group.

2010
As part of the MAZDASPEED Motorsports Development Ladder, Todd is competing in the Rolex Sports Car Series and Continental Tire Sports Car Challenge under Grand American Road Racing Association sanction.

For the 2010 Rolex Sports Car Series season Todd is driving the Racers Edge Motorsports Mazda RX-8 in Rolex GT along with Jordan Taylor.

For the 2010 Continental Tire Sports Car Challenge season Todd is driving the i-MOTO Racing MAZDASPEED3 in ST along with Glenn Bocchino.

2014
Todd won the 13 Hours at Virginia International Raceway with Elgin Racing

Todd is writing articles about his racing experience at SPEEDtv.com.

Motorsports career results

SCCA National Championship Runoffs

American open-wheel racing results
(key)

Barber Dodge Pro Series

References

External links
 Todd Lamb official website

1970 births
Kettering University alumni
Living people
Barber Pro Series drivers
SCCA National Championship Runoffs participants
Michelin Pilot Challenge drivers